is the second single by Japanese idol group STU48, released on February 13, 2019. Yumiko Takino served as lead performer for the title song. It topped the Japanese music charts in its release week.

Production and release 

The music video for the title song was filmed in one long take by quadcopter drone on location near the Senkō-ji temple in Onomichi, Hiroshima. It depicts the members dancing up the Onomichi hill and was released on December 26, 2018. Production took place over two days and ten full takes were filmed. Several alternate takes were published on the single's website.

The single was released in five editions, and four more limited editions. The B-side , included in all editions, features the first appearance in a music video of the group's theater ship STU48-go, the first ship with an onboard theater in Japan which was still under remodeling during production, and was performed by all 33 members and trainees, led by captain Nana Okada. The Limited Edition releases included the "STU48 Setouchi School Uniform Guide" bonus video content, featuring the members modelling the real-life uniforms of schools in the Setouchi region.

Reception 
"Kaze o Matsu" sold an estimated 302,533 copies in its release week according to Billboard Japan, doubling that of the previous single and placing it first in both the Oricon Singles and Billboard Japan Hot 100 charts.

Notes

References

External links 

  

2019 singles
2019 songs
Songs with lyrics by Yasushi Akimoto
King Records (Japan) singles
Oricon Weekly number-one singles
Billboard Japan Hot 100 number-one singles